Triangulation Beach is the ice-free 1.5 km long beach on the south coast of Nelson Island in the South Shetland Islands, Antarctica, extending both west and east of the south extremity of the island Vidaurre Point. Its surface area is 24.2 ha. The vicinity was visited by early 19th century sealers.

The feature is named after the triangulation method used in map making, in association with other names in the area deriving from the early development or use of geodetic instruments and methods.

Location
British mapping of the area in 1968.

Maps
 Livingston Island to King George Island. Scale 1:200000. Admiralty Nautical Chart 1776. Taunton: UK Hydrographic Office, 1968
 South Shetland Islands. Scale 1:200000 topographic map No. 3373. DOS 610 - W 62 58. Tolworth, UK, 1968
 Antarctic Digital Database (ADD). Scale 1:250000 topographic map of Antarctica. Scientific Committee on Antarctic Research (SCAR). Since 1993, regularly upgraded and updated

Notes

References
 Bulgarian Antarctic Gazetteer. Antarctic Place-names Commission. (details in Bulgarian, basic data in English)

External links
 Triangulation Beach. Adjusted Copernix satellite image

Beaches of the South Shetland Islands
Bulgaria and the Antarctic